One Night in Miami... is a 2020 American drama film directed by Regina King (in her feature film directorial debut) with a screenplay by Kemp Powers, based on his 2013 stage play of the same name. The film is a fictionalized account of a real February 1964 meeting of Malcolm X, Muhammad Ali, Jim Brown, and Sam Cooke in a room at the Hampton House, celebrating Ali's surprise title win over Sonny Liston. It stars Kingsley Ben-Adir, Eli Goree, Aldis Hodge, and Leslie Odom Jr. in the lead roles, with Lance Reddick, Joaquina Kalukango, Nicolette Robinson, and Beau Bridges in supporting roles.

One Night in Miami premiered at the Venice Film Festival on September 7, 2020, a first for an African-American female director. The film was released in limited theaters by Amazon Studios on December 25, 2020, before being released digitally on Amazon Prime Video on January 15, 2021. It received praise for King's direction, the performances (particularly from Ben-Adir and Odom), and Powers's screenplay. The film earned three nominations at the 93rd Academy Awards: Best Supporting Actor for Odom, Best Adapted Screenplay, and Best Original Song ("Speak Now"). King also earned nominations for the Golden Globe Award for Best Director and the Critics Choice Award for Best Director.

Plot 

In 1963, Cassius Clay nearly loses a boxing match to Henry Cooper at Wembley Stadium in London. At the Copacabana in New York City, soul singer Sam Cooke suffers through a performance in front of a cold, all-white audience. Returning home to Georgia, NFL player Jim Brown is received by family friend Mr. Carlton on a vast plantation. Carlton ladles praise on "the great Jim Brown," but when Brown offers to help Carlton move some furniture, Carlton uses a racial slur and informs Brown that he is not welcome inside the home due to Brown's blackness. Elsewhere, Malcolm X returns home and discusses his plans to leave the Nation of Islam with his wife, Betty.

On February 25, 1964, the men are all in Miami for Clay's title bout against Sonny Liston. Malcolm meets with Clay in a hotel room before the fight, and the two pray in a traditional Islamic fashion. That night, Brown is a ringside commentator and Cooke and Malcolm X are in the crowd as Clay upsets Liston, making him the world heavyweight champion.

Afterward, Malcolm invites the other three men to his motel room. Their hopes of a party are dashed when Malcolm makes it clear they are the only ones he invited. He wants to spend some time reflecting on their accomplishments, but tension between him and Cooke arises. Malcolm accuses Cooke of disloyalty to the black community by pandering to white audiences, and Cooke argues that his method produces greater economic empowerment for black artists. Clay informs the men of his plans to announce his conversion to the Nation of Islam, causing more tension. Brown discusses his plans to become a film actor, and wonders if it will go smoothly.

The conflict between Malcolm and Cooke escalates. Malcolm harshly ridicules the music Cooke has produced since finding success. Cooke insists his success and creative autonomy is itself an inspiration to the black community, and while he still cares about the black struggle in America, protest songs are not commercially viable. Malcolm confronts him with the success of Bob Dylan's "Blowin' in the Wind".

As they argue, it becomes clear that Malcolm's antagonism of Cooke is motivated, at least in part, by the activist's stress over his own life, especially his harassment by the FBI and fears about his schism with Elijah Muhammad. Malcolm is devastated to learn that Clay is having second thoughts about his conversion. He tells Clay that he is planning to form his own organization and asks him to join. Clay refuses, feeling betrayed by his mentor, and wondering if his conversion has been a ploy by Malcolm to attract attention to his new project. A knock at the door informs them that the press has gotten wind of the meeting. As Clay prepares to talk to the media, he asks Malcolm to come with him. When they leave, Cooke tells Brown that he has had similar thoughts about "Blowin' in the Wind" and has already written a song, but not yet performed it.

In the aftermath of the night, Clay officially changes his name to Muhammad Ali, while Malcolm's life is thrown into chaos as he suffers the consequences of his split with the Nation of Islam; his house is firebombed, but he completes his autobiography. Cooke debuts "A Change Is Gonna Come" on The Tonight Show. Brown leaves the NFL to pursue his movie career. The film ends with a title card with a quote from Malcolm on February 19, 1965, about the inevitability of martyrs for the cause, and that he was assassinated two days later on February 21.

Cast

Production 
In July 2019, Deadline Hollywood reported Regina King would direct and executive produce filming Powers' screenplay. In January 2020, King announced the casting of Kingsley Ben-Adir, Eli Goree, Aldis Hodge, Leslie Odom Jr., and Lance Reddick in the lead roles. Principal photography began in January 2020, in New Orleans, Louisiana.

In September 2020, Odom said he had co-written the original song for the film, "Speak Now" with Sam Ashworth. The official lyric video and single for "Speak Now" was released January 5, 2021. On January 20, 2021, the official music video for "Speak Now" featuring Odom was launched.

Release 
The film had its world premiere at the Venice Film Festival on September 7, 2020. It also screened at the Toronto International Film Festival, where it was the runner-up for the People's Choice Award. It has screened or been scheduled to screen at film festivals in Zurich, London, the Hamptons, Mill Valley, Middleburg, Chicago and Montclair.

Amazon Studios acquired worldwide distribution rights to the film in July 2020. It was announced for a limited theatrical release in the United States on December 25, 2020, followed by its streaming release on Amazon Prime Video on January 15. The film premiered on December 25, only exclusively at the Landmark Theatre at Merrick Park in Miami, before further expanding to select nationwide theaters on January 8, 2021, the week prior to its streaming release.

Home media 
In March 2021, it was announced that One Night in Miami... would be released on DVD and Blu-ray by The Criterion Collection. In September 2021, Criterion confirmed their edition of the film would be released on December 7, 2021.

Reception

Critical response 
The website's critics consensus reads: "A hauntingly powerful reflection on larger-than-life figures, One Night in Miami finds Regina King in command of her craft in her feature directorial debut." On Metacritic, it has a weighted average score of 83 out of 100, based on 51 critics, indicating "universal acclaim".

Kate Erbland of IndieWire gave the film an "A−" and said that "Yes, One Night in Miami often looks like the play it's based on, but King and her stars make the most of any stage-y limitations, and the filmmaker frequently turns her eye to well-assembled overhead shots and a graceful use of mirrors to keep her many characters in the frame all at once." Owen Gleiberman of Variety  praised the characters and the film's parallels to modern day, writing: "One Night in Miami is a casually entrancing debate about power on the part of those who have won it but are still figuring out what to do with it."

According to Aldis Hodge, he heard "through the grapevine" that Jim Brown - the only subject of the film alive at the film's release - liked the film and approved of Hodge's portrayal of him.

Accolades

References

External links 

 
 

2020 films
2020 directorial debut films
American biographical drama films
2020 biographical drama films
African-American drama films
American films based on plays
Films about Malcolm X
Films about Muhammad Ali
Films scored by Terence Blanchard
Films set in 1964
Films set in hotels
Films set in Miami
Films set in the 1960s
Films shot in New Orleans
Films with screenplays by Kemp Powers
Amazon Studios films
Films produced by Keith Calder
2020 independent films
2020s English-language films
2020s American films